"4 Page Letter" is a song recorded by American singer Aaliyah for her second studio album, One in a Million (1996). The song was written by both Missy Elliott and Timbaland with the latter producing the song. "4 Page Letter" is an R&B ballad in which the protagonist is expressing feelings for her crush in the form of a letter. The song was released as the album's fourth single by Blackground Records and Atlantic Records on March 18, 1997.

Upon its release, the song was met with generally positive reviews from critics, with many praising both Aaliyah's delivery and the song's production. In the United States, "4 Page Letter" peaked at number 12 on the R&B/Hip-Hop Airplay chart and at number 26 on the Rhythmic chart. Internationally, the song peaked at number 24 on the UK Singles Chart.

Music and lyrics
"4 Page Letter" is an R&B "come-on" that touches, "on the ‘60s soul trope of letter-sending romance, with a distinctly modern sensibility". The song features layered harmonies within producers Timbaland's,"mysterious, beguiling beat." Also, "The beat plods and shakes a lonely maraca line across the space of 4 Page Letter". Vocally, "Her enunciation asks that you linger on individual words she sings, when she finally begins to, thirty-some seconds into the song". While lyrically, Aaliyah "expresses her affection for a dude who caught her eye" by communicating her feelings for him in the form of a love letter. Singing "Mama always told me to be careful who I love/And daddy always told me make sure he's right/I always had my eyes on this one particular guy/I was too shy so I decided to write", Aaliyah gets intimate about her "inner-yearning for the apple of her eye and decides to get her feelings off of her chest by penning a detailed letter, which we get a glimpse of in audio form".

In September 2021, Elliott revealed that the opening lines from Aaliyah only came about after a mistake. Elliott tweeted: "When I was in the booth singing this my engineer had the music too low so I was telling him to turn it up but Aaliyah thought I meant to do it so she sung it like i did on the demo but it was a mistake … because [Aaliyah] loved the mistake I told Jimmy the engineer to keep raising the music on the track everytime she say turn it up so it would make sense to the listeners so y'all wouldn't think we was crazy".

Critical reception
Ross Scarano from Complex praised the production of "4 Page Letter", saying: "Timbaland's production is like a haunted maze you walk. And the final payoff you encounter, that languid synth line at nearly five minutes in, is so sticky and fine, you can't help but hit replay to find it again". Nakita Rathod from HotNewHipHop felt that the "slow but sexy beat" fit well with Aaliyah's voice. Kenneth Partridge from Billboard felt that Aaliyah displayed a "stunning" example of maturity beyond her years on "4 Page Letter", and that she treated Timbaland's "tissuey beat like fine stationery". In a review for One in a Million, Connie Johnson from the Los Angeles Times praised the song and called it "gently poignant". British magazine Music Week rated it four out of five, describing it as "late night slink from the teen soulstress". According to Bob Waliszewski from Plugged In, the song "finds the artist recalling–and following–her parents' advice". Bianca Gracie from Fuse believed that "4 Page Letter" remained one of the best ballads in Aaliyah's discography. In a August 2021 retrospective review, Billboard praised both Aaliyah's vocal delivery and the songs production, while declaring "the result is an arresting track that is equal parts cautious and confident".

Commercial performance
"4 Page Letter" peaked at number 12 on the US R&B/Hip-Hop Airplay chart on April 19, 1997. On the Rhythmic Top 40, the song peaked at number 26 on May 17.
In the United Kingdom, the song peaked at number 24 on the UK Singles Chart on August 30, at number 14 on the dance chart on August 24, and at number nine on the R&B chart on August 24.

In August 2021, it was reported that the album and Aaliyah's other recorded work for Blackground (since rebranded as Blackground Records 2.0) would be re-released on physical, digital, and streaming services in a deal between the label and Empire Distribution. One in a Million was reissued on August 20, 2021, despite Aaliyah's estate issuing a statement in response to Blackground 2.0's announcement, denouncing the "unscrupulous endeavor to release Aaliyah's music without any transparency or full accounting to the estate". Following the album's re-release, "4 Page Letter" debuted at number 26 on the US Digital Song Sales the week of September 4, 2021.

Music video

Background
The music video for "4 Page Letter" was directed by Daniel Pearl, while its concept was created by Aaliyah's brother Rashad Haughton. The video was conceptualized as a short story, which was translated into a short film. Pearl elaborated on the video treatment process, saying: "I basically wrote it up as a film, described it scene by scene, some descriptions of what the shots will be, etc. We went from there". The video was filmed at the Sable Ranch near Los Angeles. While discussing the video's location in an interview, Pearl said: "I had a great production designer and we basically went into an existing forest and we dressed it with some of the vintage and some of the things to make it more interesting than it was, it took a couple of days". The video's opening scene had a big crane shoot and Pearl explained that the crane was "a 75-foot long crane arm that came out of Russia. With that crane in the forest, we started up above the trees and we smoked up the background and the sunlight was coming through the trees. We drop down and pick Aaliyah up as she crosses along a stream".

Fashion
For the music video Aaliyah's stylist Derek Lee went to North Beach Leather and got several leather and suede pieces. According to Lee, he put some fringe inside of a crop top. Lastly he revealed that the jacket that she wears in one of the scenes is actually his. "Whenever you see Aaliyah wearing a big oversized men’s jacket or coat, they were always mine. I still have that coat", says Lee.

Synopsis
The video takes place in a forest and shows Aaliyah secretly watching a man dance in a clearing near a rustic village. The video moves to a circle of men watching two men fight, then Aaliyah and the man dance together in a circle of fire. Jordan Simon from Idolator felt that the video for "4 Page Letter" displayed a striking resemblance to the film Lord of the Flies and the television series Lost.

Reception
The music video for "4 Page Letter" made its television debut on the week ending April 20, 1997 on cable network channels such as BET, The Box and MTV. For the week ending June 8, 1997, the video was the 29th most-played video on MTV. Meanwhile, the video was the 20th most-played video on BET for the week ending June 15, 1997. Bianca Gracie from Fuse believed that the video "drove the romantic message home".

Track listings and formats
 UK CD1 single
"4 Page Letter" (album version) – 3:34
"4 Page Letter" (Timbaland's Main Mix) – 4:37
"4 Page Letter" (Quiet Storm Mix) – 4:33
"Death of a Playa" (featuring Rashad Haughton) – 4:53

 UK CD2 single
"4 Page Letter" (album version) – 3:34
"One in a Million" (remix featuring Ginuwine) – 5:06
"One in a Million" (Nitebreed Monogolodic Dub) – 9:52
"One in a Million" (Nitebreed Bootleg Mix) – 7:13

Charts

Release history

References

External links
 

Songs about letters (message)
1996 songs
1997 singles
Aaliyah songs
Song recordings produced by Timbaland
Songs written by Missy Elliott
Songs written by Timbaland
Contemporary R&B ballads
Atlantic Records singles
1990s ballads